Marcus Leon Freeman (born October 24, 1983) is a former American football tight end. He was originally signed by the Carolina Panthers as an undrafted free agent in 2007, he went to the Giants later that year. He played college football at Notre Dame. Although his football career was cut short, in the year he played for the Giants, the team won the Super Bowl against the undefeated Patriots, thus he has a Super Bowl ring in addition to his various licenses and degrees.

Educator
Freeman retired from football after the 2007 season and became an educator in the St. Paul, MN school district where he has served for 12 years as an educational assistant, long-term substitute teacher, a dean of students, activities director, as assistant principal for Ramsey Middle School, head principal at Galtier Community school, and he is currently the principal at Capitol Hill Gifted and Talented Magnet School.

Education
Freeman earned a Bachelor of Science degree in marketing from the University of Notre Dame, a Master of Educational Leadership from St. Mary's University of Minnesota and a Educational Administration K-12 Principal Licensure from St. Mary's University of Minnesota.

References

External links
 Notre Dame Fighting Irish bio

1983 births
Living people
American football tight ends
Carolina Panthers players
New York Giants players
Notre Dame Fighting Irish football players
Players of American football from Saint Paul, Minnesota